Ernest Abraham Hart (26 June 18357 January 1898) was an English medical journalist. He was the editor of The British Medical Journal.

Biography

Hart was born in London, the son of a Jewish dentist. He was educated at the City of London school, and became a student at St George's hospital. In 1856, he became a member of the Royal College of Surgeons, making a specialty of diseases of the eye. He was appointed ophthalmic surgeon at St Mary's hospital at the age of 28, and occupied various other posts, introducing into ophthalmic practice some modifications since widely adopted. His name, too, is associated with a method of treating popliteal aneurism, which he was the first to use in Great Britain.

His real life-work, however, was as a medical journalist, beginning with the Lancet in 1857. He was appointed editor of the British Medical Journal on 11 August 1866. During this time, the British Medical Journal'''s harsh criticism of Isaac Baker Brown lead to the complete destruction of Brown's career. As editor, Hart can be held accountable in part for this (as can the editor before him, William Orlando Markham). His campaigning editorials could be vicious. They were usually sententious and often self-congratulatory.

On 22 November 1866 Hart was appointed as a poorlaw inspector as his colleague William Orlando Markham rejected the position. He took a leading part in the exposures which led to the inquiry into the state of London work-house infirmaries, and to the reform of the treatment of sick poor throughout England, and the Infant Life Protection Act of 1872, aimed at the evils of baby-farming, was largely due to his efforts. The record of his public work covers nearly the whole field of sanitary legislation during the last thirty years of his life.

He had a hand in the amendments of the Public Health and of the Medical Acts, always promoting the medical profession above others in the public health field; in the measures relating to notification of infectious disease, to vaccination, to the registration of plumbers; in the improvement of factory legislation; in the remedy of legitimate grievances of Army and Navy medical officers; in the removal of abuses and deficiencies in crowded barrack schools; in denouncing the sanitary shortcomings of the Indian government, particularly in regard to the prevention of cholera.

His work on behalf of the British Medical Association is shown by the increase from 2,000 to 19,000 in the number of members, and the growth of the British Medical Journal from 20 to 64 pages, during his editorship. From 1872 to 1897 he was chairman of the Association's Parliamentary Bill Committee.

Beginning his collections by contacting Tadamasa Hayashi in 1882, Hart became a prominent collector of Japanese Art and later joined the Japan Society, frequently giving lectures on subjects such as Lacquerware.See , Notes on the history of lacquer : a paper read before the Japan Society of London, Ernest Hart, Japan Society, 1893 In 1891 he travelled to Japan with his second wife, Alice Hart.

Hart was also editor and proprietor of The Sanitary Record for a period, and chairman of the National Health Society.

Vaccination

In 1880, Hart authored the book The Truth About Vaccination''. It refuted the arguments made by anti-vaccinators. Each anti-vaccination allegation was disproved with medical and statistical evidence. Hart demonstrated from a vast body of evidence the advantages of how a vaccinated person can resist an attack of smallpox, compared to those un-vaccinated.

Selected publications
 An account of the condition of the infirmaries of London workhouses, 1866
The Truth About Vaccination: An Examination and Refutation of the Assertions of the Anti-Vaccinators (1880)
Hypnotism, Mesmerism and the New Witchcraft (1896)

Family
Hart married his first wife, Rosetta Levy, in 1855. He married his second wife, in 1872, Alice Marion Rowland, the sister of social reformer Henrietta Barnett. Rowland had herself studied medicine in London and Paris, and was no less interested than her husband in philanthropic reform. She was most active in her encouragement of Irish cottage industries, and was the founder of the Donegal Industrial Fund.

References

Further reading

External links

 
 

1835 births
1898 deaths
People from the City of London
British medical writers
British ophthalmologists
19th-century English medical doctors
English male journalists
British Jews
Medical journalists
19th-century British journalists
Medical journal editors
19th-century English male writers
Vaccination advocates